Euxoa siccata is a species of moth of the family Noctuidae first described by Smith in 1893. It is found in North America, including Alberta and Colorado.

The wingspan is about 30 mm.

References

Euxoa
Moths of North America
Moths described in 1893